Jaak Jakobson (born 1867) was an Estonian politician. He was a member of I Riigikogu from 29 March to 7 April 1922. He replaced Arnold Sommerling, then resigned his position and was replaced by Adolf Leevald.

On 6 December 1921, prior to taking the position, he had emigrated to Soviet Russia.

References

1867 births
Year of death missing
Central Committee of Tallinn Trade Unions politicians
Members of the Riigikogu, 1920–1923
Estonian emigrants to the Soviet Union